Carlos Eduardo Pérez Álvarez (born October 27, 1990) is a Venezuelan professional baseball catcher in the Oakland Athletics organization. He previously played in Major League Baseball (MLB) for the Los Angeles Angels, Atlanta Braves, and Texas Rangers.

Career

Toronto Blue Jays
Pérez signed with the Toronto Blue Jays as an international free agent in 2008. He played with the organization until 2012.

Houston Astros
He was acquired by the Houston Astros in a July 2012 trade along with Francisco Cordero, Ben Francisco, Asher Wojciechowski, David Rollins, Joe Musgrove and a player to be named later (Kevin Comer) in exchange for J. A. Happ, Brandon Lyon, and David Carpenter. He was added to the Astros' 40-man roster on November 3, 2014.

Los Angeles Angels of Anaheim / Los Angeles Angels
On November 5, 2014, the Astros traded Pérez and Nick Tropeano to the Los Angeles Angels of Anaheim in exchange for Hank Conger.

Pérez was promoted to the major leagues on May 4, 2015, to back up Chris Iannetta. In his major league debut on May 5, 2015, he hit a walk-off home run off of Dominic Leone giving the Angels a 5–4 victory over the Seattle Mariners. He finished the season hitting .250 with 4 home runs in 86 games. The following season, he hit .209 in 87 games. In 2017, he played the majority of the season in the Angels AAA system, he was promoted when rosters expanded in September. Pérez was designated for assignment on March 28, 2018, in order to make room for Shohei Ohtani on the Angels roster.

Atlanta Braves
On March 31, 2018, Pérez was traded to the Atlanta Braves in exchange for Ryan Schimpf. He appeared in 8 games for the Braves, going 3-for-21 with a walk. The Braves designated Pérez for assignment on April 27.

Texas Rangers
On May 2, 2018, Pérez was claimed off waivers by the Texas Rangers. He played in 20 games for Texas, hitting .143/.177/.245 with one home run and 3 RBI. On July 16, 2018, Pérez was removed from the 40-man roster and sent outright to the Triple-A Round Rock Express. In 22 games for Round Rock, Pérez batted .317/.368/.494 with 4 home runs and 13 RBI. He elected free agency after the season.

Baltimore Orioles
On January 7, 2019, Pérez signed a minor league deal with the Baltimore Orioles organization. He spent the majority of the year with the Double-A Bowie Baysox, also appearing briefly for the Triple-A Norfolk Tides. In 102 total games, Pérez hit .243/.293/.417 14 home runs and 60 RBI. He elected minor league free agency after the season.

Oakland Athletics
On November 25, 2019, Pérez signed a minor league contract, that included an invite to major league spring training, with the Oakland Athletics. Pérez did not play in a game in 2020 due to the cancellation of the minor league season because of the COVID-19 pandemic. He became a free agent on November 2, 2020. 

On January 29, 2021, Pérez re-signed with the Athletics organization and was invited to Spring Training. Pérez spent the 2021 season with the Triple-A Las Vegas Aviators. He played in 97 games, hitting .269/.337/.572 with 31 home runs and 89 RBI. He became a free agent following the season.

Colorado Rockies
On February 6, 2022, Pérez signed a minor league contract with the Colorado Rockies. Pérez played in 117 games for the Triple-A Albuquerque Isotopes, slashing .254/.341/.524 with a whopping 31 home runs and 87 RBI. He elected free agency on November 10.

Oakland Athletics (second stint)
On March 19, 2023, Pérez signed a minor league contract to return to the Oakland Athletics organization.

See also
 List of Major League Baseball players from Venezuela

References

External links

 

1990 births
Living people
Atlanta Braves players
Auburn Doubledays players
Bowie Baysox players
Corpus Christi Hooks players
Dominican Summer League Blue Jays players
Gulf Coast Blue Jays players
Lancaster JetHawks players
Lansing Lugnuts players
Leones del Caracas players
Las Vegas Aviators players
Los Angeles Angels players
Major League Baseball catchers
Major League Baseball players from Venezuela
Norfolk Tides players
Oklahoma City RedHawks players
Salt Lake Bees players
Texas Rangers players
Venezuelan expatriate baseball players in the United States
Frisco RoughRiders players
Round Rock Express players
Sportspeople from Valencia, Venezuela